The history of the Knights of Columbus and the Catholic University of America dates back to the founding of the university. The Order founded a "Knights of Columbus College".

Early years

Both the university and the Order were founded in the 1880s, and they have been closely aligned ever since.  On June 5, 1898, Keane Council 353 was established at the university, though in later years it moved off campus. 

On March 7, 1899 Vice Rector and Knight Phillip Garrigan addressed the National Council, asking for establishment of a Knights of Columbus Chair of American History at the University, to counter what he perceived as an "anti-Catholic bias" in history-writing at the time. His vision was for the historian who took the chair to be of high stature. It would take  three years to collect the amount of $55,0000 to fund the Columbus Chair of American History. The intention of the exercise was to prove to critics within the Church itself, that the Order was sufficiently orthodox. The establishment of the Knights of Columbus Chair inaugurated the department of history at the University.The first occupant of the chair was Dr. Charles Hallan McCarthy.  McCarthy, who studied at the University of Pennsylvania, was teaching in a high school and was not a Knight, and thus was a controversial selection.  Some thought the position should go to John H. Ewing, a professor at the University of Notre Dame and the first state deputy of Indiana.  McCarthy performed well in the position however, and directed several influential graduate students, including Matthew J. Walsh.

In 1920, Pope Benedict XV singled out the contribution of the Order to the University.

Scholarships

In December 1904, Cardinal Gibbons appealed to the Knights for more financial aid to help meet operating costs after some investments went sour, and the Order gave nearly $25,000.  In his letter, he referred to the Knights' "princely munificence" and added that "I know that your bounty is limited only by your means."  

By 1907 the financial situation of Catholic University had improved but was still shaky.   Archbishop John J. Glennon of St. Louis, chairman of a committee to plan for a $500,000 endowment, appealed to the Knights as the committee believed the Order was the only organization which could raise such a large sum.  On August 8th he addressed the national convention in Norfolk, urging the Order to "fuse the activities of your Society into one grand movement that would stand out at the head of all Catholic National and Charitable movements in the United States."  He added that doing so would "give you the position your friends believe you are entitled to, namely the leading Catholic Society of the leading Catholic people of the United States."

Hearn did not endorse the proposal, and by at least one account seemed cool to the idea, but left it to the "serious and careful thoughts of the delegates."  The National Council accepted the idea in principal, although several proposals to raise the funds could not find enough support to pass.  Eventually, Hearn was instructed to appoint a committee to settle the matter.

After some delay, a committee was assembled in January 1908 and finally in December devised a plan that won the support of the Board of Directors in April 1909.  Every Knight was mailed a letter and was asked to voluntarily contribute $1 a year for a five-year period.  On December 6, 1913 the goal was realized.

At Cardinal Gibbons's residence in Baltimore on January 6, 1914, a party headed by new Supreme Knight James A. Flaherty presented $500,000 in securities, the results of the fund drive for Catholic University. The University and the Order agreed that rather than an endowment as originally planned, the funds would be used to establish fellowships for M.A. or Ph.D. studies with the hope of producing teachers for both Catholic and secular colleges and universities.  Originally there was to be one fellowship for every $10,000, with preference going to Knights or their families. 

By 1922, 146 K. of C. Fellowships had been awarded.  In later years the funds permitted far fewer fellowships, which, in the words of the University's centennial history in 1990 "have remained the most attractive fellowships under the control of the university despite drastic reductions in their number due to the effects of inflation upon university charges for tuition, board, and room."

The fellowships established by the Order, and the active interest shown by some members of the faculty in the Knights, made the University a good place to look for members. In February 1925, Washington Council arranged for a smoker at the University for faculty and students.  As a result, a Knights of Columbus Club was organized which in turn resulted in the initiation of about fifty students into the Council annually during the next few years. Some became officers.

Sun Bowl
After the 1940 Sun Bowl, Knights of Columbus in El Paso took the Cardinal football players over the border for lunch in the "squalid but colorful Mexican town" of Ciudad Juárez.

Columbus School of Law

With the success of its vocational courses in camps to prepare World War I veterans for civilian life, the Supreme Council established an Education Committee in June 1919.  This Committee later established a national tuition-free evening school program for veterans. By November, when the War Department took over the camp vocational courses from volunteer agencies, the Knights had nearly seven thousand students in twenty-five camps.  Washington Council Grand Knight Frank O'Hara, head of the economics department at the University, taught with other Knights teach in the Washington program, which focused on high school subjects. He later become dean of the school, and liberal arts and professional courses were added. 
 
In 1921 Catholic University "affiliated" with the Knights of Columbus evening school for its college courses, and three years later also recognized its secondary school courses.  This allowed "a large group of Catholic students who otherwise would go elsewhere to continue their studies" to instead attend CUA, as the annual report of the rector stated. The school was located at St. John's College on Vermont Avenue, with 1,500 students registered, and a faculty of 24, of whom twenty were from the CUA. A committee of University trustees saw it as "practically under University control, though not officially so."

The evening school had developed into Columbus University and obtained a charter in 1922. It was reported that the Order's Board of Directors was disassociating itself from the institution. Though there was appreciation among ecclesiastical officials of the service provided to those who couldn't regularly attend a university, there was also concern in the Catholic University administration about the confusion that could result from the close relationship between CUA and Columbus University. During this time there was a lessening of the role of the CUA teachers. O'Hara resigned as president of Columbus University and from its board, though he continued to teach, and there was a reduction of the course offerings to accounting and law. Sometime in the years 1923–25, the five councils of Washington D.C. voted on whether to keep the school open, with three favoring and two against.

Three decades later, in 1954, Columbus University would merge with the law program of CUA to become The Columbus School of Law at The Catholic University of America  after the American Bar Association in 1951 challenged law schools not affiliated with a university. The CUA law school was the first professional school of the University, and occupied the remodeled downtown building of the former Columbus University for over two decades, until 1966, when it moved to a new building on the campus.

Buildings
The chairman of the committee that handled the fund-raising for the 1914 fellowships, Edward H. Doyle,  expressed at the time of the presentation the hope that the Order would donate another $100,000 to pay for a dormitory for the 50 fellows. The University did complete its second dormitory building just in time to house them, and it became known as Graduate Hall, but it would be renamed several times (including University Center, then Cardinal Hall) in later years and is now known as O'Connell Hall.  In the 20th century this building housed the $50,000 check from 1904, and on its upper floors the Catholic University Council No. 9542 held its meetings and had an office.

In 1920, the Order contributed $60,000 toward the Catholic University gymnasium and drill hall, which later became the Crough Building housing the School of Architecture.  On October 1, 1994, the Columbus School of Law dedicated its new building on campus. The Knights of Columbus are listed among the seven donors of "Leadership Gifts" of $500,000 or more and a plaque in the courtyard especially honors the Knights.

At the 2006 American Cardinals Dinner, Supreme Knight Carl Anderson announced an $8,000,000 gift to the university to renovate Keane Hall and rename it McGivney Hall, after the Knights' founder, Michael J. McGivney.  The building, which was vacant, now houses the Washington session of the  Pontifical John Paul II Institute for Studies on Marriage and Family.

Recent history
A $1,000,000 trust was established in August 1965 to fund the Pro Deo and Pro Patria Scholarship, providing twelve undergraduate scholarships annually to sons and daughters of Knights who earned the highest scores on a competitive examination.  

On April 7, 1988 The Catholic University Council No. 9542 presented a special plaque to new Supreme Chaplain, Bishop Thomas V. Daily, a member of the University's Board, in a gala event attended by the Supreme Knight and Knights from DC and the neighboring jurisdictions. The 10-foot-high check the Knights gave the University in 1904 was temporarily moved from its permanent location and set up in the Caldwell Hall where the event took place, to be seen by most present for the first time.

The North American Campus of the Pope John Paul II Institute on Marriage and the Family, funded by the Knights and established at the Dominican House of Studies, adjacent to the CUA campus, opens its first academic year on September 8, 1988. At the 1989 Supreme Convention in Baltimore, the Order voted a $2,000,000 birthday gift to the U.S. bishops on their bicentennial, to be given to Catholic University and used to fund special projects jointly chosen by the University and the Order. Proceeds from this fund helped to finance the construction of the Columbus School of Law building.

Supreme Knight Luke E. Hart was granted a Doctor of Laws degree in 1957, and Supreme Knight John W. McDevitt was awarded a Doctor of Humane Letters in 1967. In 2008 Carl and Dorian  Anderson were awarded Doctor of Theology degrees.  Their daughter had graduated from the university several years before. Anderson and his immediate predecessor, Virgil Dechant, have both served on the CUA board.  

In 2010s, the Knights made a gift of $158,400 to the University to establish the Pope Benedict XVI Chair in Theology. An additional gift of $328,600 in 2015 was for the support of educational conferences and the Benedict XVI "chair in theology fund."

References

Sources

External links

The Catholic University of America
 Knights of Columbus

Catholic University of America
Knights of Columbus